El Salto Airport is an airport  northwest of Parral, a city in the Maule Region of Chile.

See also

Transport in Chile
List of airports in Chile

References

External links
OpenStreetMap - El Salto
OurAirports - El Salto
FallingRain - El Salto Airport

Airports in Maule Region